The 2003 Porsche Carrera Cup Great Britain was the inaugural year for a multi-event, one make motor racing championship held across England and Ireland. The championship featured a mix of professional motor racing teams and privately funded drivers, competing in Porsche 911 GT3 cars that conform to the technical regulations for the championship. It forms part of the extensive program of support categories built up around the BTCC centrepiece.

This season was the inaugural Porsche Carrera Cup Great Britain. The season began on 21 April at Mondello Park and concluded on 21 September at Oulton Park, after ten races, all in support of the 2003 British Touring Car Championship.

Barry Horne became the first drivers' champion, competing with Team Parker Racing, while Team BCR won the Teams' Championship.

Race calendar and winners
All races were held in the United Kingdom (excepting Mondello Park round that held in Ireland).

Championship standings

Drivers' Championship
Points were awarded on a 20, 18, 16, 14, 12, 10, 9, 8, 7, 6, 5, 4, 3, 2, 1 basis to the top 15 finishers in each race, with 1 point for the fastest lap in each race and 1 point for pole position in the first race of each meeting.

Teams' Championship

References

Porsche Carrera Cup Great Britain seasons
Porsche Carrera Cup